HLSQ-FM, also known as SBS Power FM, is a K-pop music radio station of the Seoul Broadcasting System. The station is heard nationwide via syndication with local FM stations in Korea via HLDG-FM in Busan, HLDE-FM in Daegu, HLDH-FM in Gwangju, HLDF-FM in Daejeon, HLDP-FM in Ulsan, HLDQ-FM in Jeonju, HLDR-FM in Cheongju, HLCG-FM in Gangwon, HLQC-FM in Jeju and HLKJ-FM in Seogwipo.

History 
 October 1996: Seoul Broadcasting System made plans for an FM radio station to complement HLSQ.
 October 30, 1996: Seoul Broadcasting System started FM test broadcast.
 November 14, 1996: SBS Power FM Launched.
 2003: SBS Regional FM Network completed.
 2004: Started South Korea's first internet radio broadcast via Gorealra PC application.
 2005: Began South Korea's first internet visual radio (BORA) broadcast.
 November 9, 2010: SBS Power FM Dongducheon relay station started broadcasting.
 2012: Topped rating rank for the first half of the year.
 November 14, 2016: The station celebrated its 20th anniversary.

Stations

Seoul, Incheon, and Gyeonggi Province

Other provinces 
 Dongducheon via Dongducheon SBS on FM 100.3MHz
 Gangwon via HLCG-FM on FM 103.1MHz, FM 105.1MHz, FM 106.1MHz, FM 99.3MHz and FM 88.3MHz
 Daejeon Chungnam Sejong via HLDF-FM on FM 95.7MHz and FM 96.5MHz
 Cheongju via HLDR-FM on FM 101.5MHz, FM 97.9MHz and FM 102.7MHz
 Jeonju via HLDQ-FM on FM 90.1MHz
 Gwangju Jeonnam via HLDH-FM on FM 101.1MHz and FM 96.7MHz
 Daegu Gyeongbuk via HLDE-FM on FM 99.3MHz, FM 99.7MHz and FM 106.5MHz
 Busan Gyeongnam via HLDG-FM on FM 99.9MHz, FM 96.3MHz, FM 102.5MHz, FM 105.5MHz and FM 106.7MHz
 Ulsan via HLDP-FM on FM 92.3MHz
 Jeju via HLQC-FM on FM 101.5MHz
 Seogwipo via HLKJ-FM on FM 98.5MHz
 Hallim via HLQC-FM on FM 95.9MHz

Programs
Cho Jung-shik's Fun Fun Today^^
Kim Young-chul's Power FM^
Kim Chang-wan's Beautiful Morning^^
Jang Ye-won's Cinetown^^
Choi Hwa-jung's Power Time^
Jeong Chan-woo and Kim Tae-gyun's CulTwo Show^
DJ Boom's BoomBoomPower^^
Park So-Hyeon's Love Game^^
 Wendy's Youngstreet^^
Bae Sung-jae's TEN^^
DinDin's Music High^^
Kim Joo-woo's Pops Station^^
^ Heard nationwide through regional affiliates
^^ Heard through selected regional affiliates

Trivia 
 SBS Power FM is South Korea's top-rated FM station. In the latest 2020 first quarter radio survey, SBS Power FM topped the ranking followed by TBS FM at number 2, CBS Music FM at number 3, MBC FM4U at number 4, KBS Radio 2 at number 5 and the sister Love FM at number 6.
 Devoted SBS Power FM listeners mostly in their 20s to 30s are called Everlasting because the station is the only one to air solely K-pop music (unlike KBS Cool FM and MBC FM4U — the former of which airs mostly trot at some shows whereas the latter also airs foreign music at some timeslots) due to the popularity of the station the fans wants the FM station to last forever.

Logo song 

The logo song is the short jargon placed in-between some ads during program broadcasting, and also to start and to end every program.

20th Anniversary Song Project

See also 
 KBS Radio 3
 SBS Love FM

References

External links 
 SBS Power FM Live Stream
 http://w3.sbs.co.kr/radio/radioFrequency.do
 http://w3.sbs.co.kr/radio/main.do
 https://web.archive.org/web/20071023070757/http://global.sbs.co.kr/English/AboutSBSCo/channel.jsp
 http://w3.sbs.co.kr/schedule/scheduleSub.do?depth02=d2_3&depth03=love&channel=Love
 http://tv.sbs.co.kr/broadplan/pop_fm.html
 http://radio.sbs.co.kr/charge/charge_powerfm.jsp

Power FM
Radio stations in South Korea
Radio stations established in 1996